The Counter-Insurgency and Jungle Warfare School (CIJWS) in Vairengte, Mizoram, India is a training and research establishment of the Indian Army specialising in unconventional warfare, especially counter-insurgency and guerrilla warfare. CIJWS is one of the premier counter-insurgency training institutions in the world. The school's motto is to "fight the guerrilla like a guerrilla".

History
The original plans to set up a counter-insurgency unit to train soldiers came about following the government response to the Mizo militancy in the 1960s. 

CIJWS was established in 1967 as the Jungle Training School. It was initially located in Mynkre, near Jowal in Jaintia Hills district of Meghalaya. In 1968, the designation was changed to Eastern Command Counter Insurgency Training School. On 1 May 1970, it was upgraded to a Category A Training Establishment of the Indian Army, given its current name and relocated to Vairengte. Brigadier Mathew Thomas was appointed the school's first Commandant.

The crisis in neighbouring East Pakistan and the resulting liberation struggle for Bangladesh prompted a temporary refocus as the Mukti Bahini guerrillas were trained at the institute. Operation Jackpot undertaken by the Mukti Bahini rebels was an instance of the school's training success. Since the Indo-Pakistani War of 1971, CIJWS has focused to its primary role of counter-insurgency training.

CIJWS has hosted visiting military units for training from the United States, Singapore, Nepal, Bhutan, Russia, United Kingdom, Israel, France, Bangladesh and many other nations.

The success of this school prompted the establishment of another counter-insurgency training centre, the Kaziranga Special Jungle Warfare Training School in Assam.

Training methods

Since its inception, the School has constantly evolved in stature and strength, in keeping with the changing dynamics of insurgency and terrorism in the country. Its relevance has grown manifold with the mushrooming of small and big insurgent/terrorist groups in the country and worldwide. With its vast expertise in counter-insurgency and counter-terrorism training, it has truly come into its own as a centre of excellence in such operations . The School has continuously incorporated all the lessons learnt during such operations and has painstakingly kept its training curriculum contemporary. It presently trains over 7000 officers and soldiers every year . Its scope and mandate has increased with Para Military Forces, Police, Services and foreign component adding to the numbers and compositions.

Soldiers receive training in identifying improvised explosive devices (IED), jungle survival, counter terrorism, and interrogation techniques.

The training focuses on physical fitness, reflex firing techniques and tactical lessons. The module for training is practical oriented with number of lectures, discussions, case studies, sand model exercises & outdoor exercises. Live situations are painted during the outdoor exercises to judge the reaction of the soldiers at the spur of the moment. The troops are taught to live in difficult and hostile terrain, eat and sleep like the guerrillas and strike as silently as the guerrillas. The school boasts of excellent training areas, training facilities, with thirteen firing ranges and a training school whose instructors have had experience in fighting the terrorists within India.

The inherent characteristic of insurgency in northeast India is small scale low profile activities, with the main insurgent bases located across the border . Hit and run tactics executed by small units force a large deployment of armed forces to counter them . Deploying large force is useless as it never produces any result . Learning to operate in small teams, studying the pattern of the militants, establishing an intelligence network, knowing their traditional sanctuaries, maintaining the element of surprise, selecting the site for counter ambush, observing the discipline of when exactly to open fire, knowing field craft and jungle craft well enough to remain undetected, and improvising within a given situation, is the kind of stuff that breaks an ambush .

Jungle operations test soldiers to their limit which needs special tactics, techniques and procedures . In this scenario soldiers were given physical drills and common-sense tips  on how to survive in the jungle by studying its characteristics, dense vegetation with limited visibility, heavy cross compartmentalisation, streams & rivers, heat & humidity, few roads, numerous tracks and limited communication.

The normal schedule is about eight weeks, during which a soldier undergoes strenuous drills that make him conversant with guerrilla warfare and low-intensity conflicts. The training module is non-conventional and once a soldier undergoes training here, he can face deadly situations anywhere in the world in all-weather terrain, eat and sleep like a guerrilla and strike as silently as a guerrilla . The training module includes lectures, seminars and mock operations in the rugged jungles in Mizoram. The trainees are also exposed to media interaction, civic actions plus fraternisation, human rights and collection of intelligence and their analysis.

Soldiers undergoing a course here not only go through rigorous physical training, but also tough mental training through lectures and problems posed by instructors of the school. An importance placed in the top list of this school is how to avoid collateral damage as much as possible. With precision shooting, the soldiers engage in exercises where live rounds are used to shoot down plywood terrorists inside homes and stores without hitting the civilian population.

International Participation
Taking into account the successes in combating militancy, the Indian Army opened the school to soldiers from other countries in 2001. Three US Army officers were the first overseas batch to be trained. After the 9/11 terror strikes in the US, CIJWS began attracting troops from around the world. In 2003, a group of about 100 US Special Forces soldiers completed a three-week counter-insurgency combat training at the institute. The exercise, code-named Balance Iroquois, saw them undergo an intensive exercise along with soldiers from the Indian Army's Para (Special Forces) at the CIJWS. Troops were trained to feed on venomous vipers, dogs and monkeys as part of military exercises to sharpen their skills in jungle survival and combat.

Indian Army soldiers and US Army and National Guard soldiers trained together in Exercise Yudh Abhyas 04. The two forces focused on reflexive firing, ambush, jungle patrolling, survival in the jungle and a fast roping technique called slithering. France, UK, Israel and Italy are the latest to have sought India's help in training their soldiers in counter-insurgency operations at this elite facility.

See also
 Indian National Defence University
 Military Academies in India
 Sainik school

References

Military academies of India
Military education and training in India
Counterinsurgency
Kolasib
1967 establishments in Assam
Jungle warfare training facilities